Inès Feriel Ibbou (born 5 January 1999) is an Algerian tennis player. She's considered as the youngest female tennis player to win a senior ITF tournament in tennis history (14 y/o and 8 months). 

She has career-high WTA rankings of 464 in singles and 293 in doubles, both achieved on 30 January 2023. Ibbou has won three singles and six doubles titles on the ITF Circuit.

Playing for Algeria Fed Cup team, Ibbou has a win–loss record of 5–5 in Fed Cup competition.

Junior career

Junior Grand Slam performance
Singles:
 Australian Open: –
 French Open: 2R (2015, 2016)
 Wimbledon: 1R (2015)
 US Open: 1R (2015)

Doubles:
 Australian Open: –
 French Open: QF (2016)
 Wimbledon: 1R (2015)
 US Open: 1R (2015)

ITF finals

Singles: 8 (3 titles, 5 runner–ups)

Doubles: 10 (6 titles, 4 runner–ups)

ITF junior finals

Singles: 4 (4 titles)

Doubles: 6 (3 titles, 3 runner–ups)

National representation

Fed Cup/Billie Jean King Cup
Ibbou made her Fed Cup debut for Algeria in 2015, while the team was competing in the Europe/Africa Zone Group III, when she was 16 years and 99 days old.

Singles (2–2)

Doubles (3–3)

External links
 
 
 

1999 births
Living people
Algerian female tennis players
People from El Biar
Mediterranean Games competitors for Algeria
Competitors at the 2022 Mediterranean Games
21st-century Algerian women